Arizmendi Bakery is a bakery located in the San Francisco Bay Area of California in the United States. They have locations in San Francisco, Berkeley, Emeryville, San Rafael, and in Oakland.  They are a worker-owned cooperative. In 2011, they were voted the best bakery in the east bay by the East Bay Express. The bakery makes pastries, pizza and bread. Arizmendi Bakery came out of the Cheese Board Collective, forming in 1997. It was named after Basque priest and labor organizer José María Arizmendiarrieta. Food reviewer Tamara Palmer, from SF Weekly, called their Auntie Mabel's Kookie Brittle the best cookie in San Francisco. They also make fruitcake, using local dried fruits from the Rainbow Grocery Cooperative. During December 2011, the San Francisco location sold 400 fruitcakes daily.

Gallery

References

External links
Official website
Members of the San Rafael location on Making Contact
"Why Buy Local: Arizmendi Bakery and Pizzeria" from Secret News"Arizmendi bakery collective rises in Emeryville" from SFGate''

Bakeries of California
Cuisine of the San Francisco Bay Area
Worker cooperatives of the United States
Organizations based in Oakland, California
1997 establishments in California
American companies established in 1997